The Our Savior's Lutheran Church near Menno, South Dakota is a church in Yankton County, South Dakota.  It was built in 1935 and was added to the National Register of Historic Places in 2001.

It was deemed architecturally notable "as an excellent example of a second generation, vernacular Late Gothic Revival building."

References

Lutheran churches in South Dakota
Churches on the National Register of Historic Places in South Dakota
Gothic Revival church buildings in South Dakota
Churches completed in 1935
Churches in Yankton County, South Dakota
National Register of Historic Places in Yankton County, South Dakota